During the afternoon of 25 April 2015, a MW 7.8 earthquake struck Nepal and surrounding countries. Shaking from the quake triggered an avalanche from Pumori into Base Camp on Mount Everest. At least twenty-two people were killed, surpassing an avalanche that occurred in 2014 as the deadliest disaster on the mountain.

Avalanches

The earthquake triggered several large avalanches on and around the mountain. One avalanche, originating on the nearby peak of Pumori, swept into Base Camp and blew many tents across the Khumbu Glacier towards the lower Icefall. An Indian Army mountaineering team recovered the bodies of 19 mountaineers from the South Base Camp and rescued at least 61 stranded climbers from the mountain.

At least 61 people were injured, with dozens initially reported missing, and many more stranded at camps at higher elevations, having lost secure descent routes.

Rescue operations

Helicopters reached Mount Everest on the morning of 26 April to commence rescue operations, managing to transport 22 of the badly injured to Pheriche village, before the operation was halted by bad weather. Pheriche is an important stopover for climbers, and has a rudimentary hospital staffed by volunteer doctors from the Himalayan Rescue Association.

Later that day, a helicopter reportedly evacuated several climbers from Camp I, the first camp above Base Camp, with some 100 mountaineers still unable to safely descend from Camps I and II. Expedition leaders decided to try to evacuate climbers from Camp I by repairing the route through the Khumbu Icefall. On 26 April, a helicopter dropped additional technical gear at Camp I, and a team of Sherpas and foreign guides attempted to re-establish the route from the top back down to Base Camp. Simultaneously, another team dispatched from Base Camp tried to re-establish the route from the bottom up. But this attempt was unsuccessful as a subsequent avalanche took out most of the ladders and reportedly killed three Sherpas at Khumbu Icefall, pushing the death toll on the mountain to at least 24. Further climbers were rescued via helicopter on 27 April.  Climbers at Base Camp posted on Twitter in the days after the disaster, writing of "great desolation" and "high uncertainty" among those who were left, and stating that the area looked as if it had been hit by a nuclear bomb; one mountaineer, commenting on Facebook, said that people stuck higher up on the mountain were "getting desperate". On 27 April, 60 people were rescued from Camp I and 170 were rescued from Camp II. Seventeen bodies were found on 25 April, and one was found on 27 April. On 26 April, one of the 61 badly injured died at KMC hospital.

Deaths

A Nepal Mountaineering Association report on 28 April listed 19 deaths, of which 10 were identified as Nepalese Sherpas and five were foreign climbers. Four were not identified by name. The five climbers were listed as two Americans, one Chinese, one Australian and one Japanese. On 27 April, National Geographic reported 24 deaths.

Google executive Dan Fredinburg, who was climbing Everest with three company employees while mapping the area for a future Google Earth-type project, and three other Americans, were confirmed dead.

Effect on 2015 climbing season
Although the ladders at the Khumbu Icefall were damaged by the avalanches, a handful of mountaineers, undeterred by the disaster, immediately sought Nepalese government permission to continue with their attempt on the mountain and were granted permission to do so on 29 April 2015. "The ladders will be repaired in the next two to three days and climbing will continue, there is no reason for anyone to quit their expedition," said Tulsi Gautam, chief of the Nepal Department of Tourism. "There is no scientific reason to expect another quake... and we feel the ground is stable enough for climbing despite aftershocks."

The closure of routes over the icefall for the remainder of the season was later announced, the second consecutive year that the mountain has been closed due to avalanches. After the second earthquake on 12 May 2015, Dambar Parajuli, president of the Expedition Operators' Association of Nepal, said there were no climbers or Nepali sherpa guides remaining at Everest Base Camp.  As a result, no one climbed Mount Everest in the spring of 2015, the first time in 41 years that this has happened.

In August one climbing permit was issued, to Japanese mountaineer Nobukazu Kuriki. He turned around 700m below the summit in October (in the autumn post-monsoon season). He had tried four times previously, losing all his fingers to frostbite.

List of fatalities

See also 
 List of deaths on eight-thousanders
 List of Mount Everest death statistics
 List of people who died climbing Mount Everest
 Mount Everest in 2017

References

External links 
 Name List of 15 identified dead body among 19 dead body found at Mt. Everest  // Nepal Mountaineering Association
  

Mount Everest avalanches
Mount Everest avalanches
2015
Mount Everest avalanches
Natural disasters in Nepal
Mount Everest avalanches
2010s avalanches
Avalanches in Nepal
Mount Everest avalanches
Mountaineering in Nepal
2015 disasters in Nepal